The 2020–21 season is Universo Treviso Basket's 10th in existence (6th after the re-foundation) and the club's 3rd consecutive season in the top tier Italian basketball.

Kit 
Supplier: Erreà / Sponsor: NutriBullet

Players

Current roster

Depth chart

Squad changes

In

|}

Out

|}

Confirmed 

|}

Coach

Competitions

Supercup

Group stage

Playoffs

Serie A

Basketball Champion League

Qualifiers

Regular season

References 

2021–22 Basketball Champions League
2021–22 in Italian basketball by club